The 2019–20 FIS Cross-Country World Cup was the 39th official World Cup season in cross-country skiing for men and women. The season began on 29 November 2019 in Ruka, Finland and concluded on 8 March 2020 in Oslo, Norway.

The Sprint Tour, a stage event scheduled in Quebec City and Minneapolis on 14–17 March 2020 was cancelled due to the coronavirus pandemic. The same reason forced the cancellation of World Cup scheduled in Canmore on 20–22 March 2020, including mixed relay.

Calendar

Men

Women

Men's team

Women's team

Mixed team

Men's standings

Overall

Distance

Sprint

Prize money

U23

Bonus Ranking

Women's standings

Overall

Distance

Sprint

Prize money

U23

Bonus Ranking

Nations Cup

Overall

Men

Women

Points distribution 
The table shows the number of points won in the 2019/20 Cross-Country Skiing World Cup for men and women. Team Sprint and Relay points are included only in Nations Cup, don't impact on individual rankings.

Achievements 

Only individual events.

First World Cup career victory

Men
  Hans Christer Holund, 30, in his 9th season – the WC 1 (15 km F Pursuit) in Ruka; first podium was 2014–15 WC 4 (30 km Skiathlon) in Lillehammer
  Lucas Chanavat, 25, in his 5th season – the WC 5 (Sprint F) in Planica; first podium was 2017–18 WC 8 (Sprint F) in Lenzerheide

Women
  Linn Svahn, 20, in her 2nd season – the WC 3 (Sprint F) in Davos; also first podium
  Frida Karlsson, 20, in her 2nd season – the WC 17 (30 km C Mass Start) in Oslo; also first podium

First World Cup podium

Men
  Håvard Solås Taugbøl, 26, in his 7th season – no. 3 in the WC 3 (Sprint F) in Davos
  Ivan Yakimushkin, 23, in his 3rd season – no. 2 in the WC 6 (15 km F) in Toblach
  Johan Häggström, 27, in his 4th season – no. 3 in the WC 7 (Sprint F) in Dresden
  Martin Løwstrøm Nyenget, 27, in his 7th season – no. 3 in the WC 14 (15 km C Pursuit) in Östersund
  Renaud Jay, 28, in his 9th season – no. 3 in the WC 14 (Sprint F) in Åre

Women
  Linn Svahn, 20, in her 2nd season – no. 1 in the WC 3 (Sprint F) in Davos
  Julia Kern, 22, in her 4th season – no. 3 in the WC 5 (Sprint F) in Planica
  Katharina Hennig, 23, in her 5th season – no. 3 in the WC 6 (10 km C Mass Start) in Val di Fiemme
  Frida Karlsson, 20, in her 2nd season – no. 1 in the WC 17 (30 km C Mass Start) in Oslo

Victories in this World Cup (all-time number of victories in parentheses)

Men
  Johannes Høsflot Klæbo, 10 (37) first places
  Alexander Bolshunov, 9 (17) first places
  Pål Golberg, 3 (7) first places
  Sergey Ustiugov, 2 (15) first places
  Iivo Niskanen, 2 (5) first places
  Simen Hegstad Krüger, 2 (3) first places
  Lucas Chanavat, 2 (2) first places
  Emil Iversen, 1 (7) first place
  Sjur Røthe, 1 (5) first place
  Hans Christer Holund, 1 (1) first place

Women
  Therese Johaug, 20 (73) first places
  Linn Svahn, 3 (3) first places
  Maiken Caspersen Falla, 2 (21) first places
  Anamarija Lampič, 2 (3) first places
  Jonna Sundling, 2 (3) first places
  Ingvild Flugstad Østberg, 1 (17) first place
  Astrid Uhrenholdt Jacobsen, 1 (6) first place
  Natalya Nepryayeva, 1 (2) first place
  Frida Karlsson, 1 (1) first place

Retirements
The following athletes announced their retirements during or after the season:

Men
 Martin Bergström
 Erik Bjornsen
 Eirik Brandsdal
 Sondre Turvoll Fossli
 Lari Lehtonen
 Toni Livers
 Andrew Newell
 Teodor Peterson
 Fredrik Riseth
 Bernhard Tritscher
 Thomas Wick

Women
 Vesna Fabjan
 Elizabeth Guiney
 Astrid Uhrenholdt Jacobsen
 Stina Nilsson - Change of sport (Biathlon)
 Emily Nishikawa
 Jennie Öberg
 Katja Višnar

Footnotes

References 

 
FIS Cross-Country World Cup seasons
World Cup
World Cup
Cross-Country